Caridina striata is a freshwater shrimp from Sulawesi. It is endemic to Lake Poso and Lake Towuti. Common names in the aquarium hobby are red line shrimp and red stripe shrimp. It is commonly found on rocky substrates.

Threats
It is currently under threat by introduced species like the flowerhorn cichlid, organic pollution by the human activities and pollution caused by a nickel mine.

References

Atyidae
Freshwater crustaceans of Asia
Endemic freshwater shrimp of Sulawesi
Crustaceans described in 2009